Pablo Sittler (18 February 1925 – 22 February 2008) was a Guatemalan sports shooter. He competed in the 50 metre rifle, prone event at the 1968 Summer Olympics.

References

1925 births
2008 deaths
Guatemalan male sport shooters
Olympic shooters of Guatemala
Shooters at the 1968 Summer Olympics